Pelo Brasil (At Brazil in English) it is the ninth album and third DVD of Banda Calypso, launched in September 2006. The band invests a large project for a tour in 5 capital and each make a passage to a CD / DVD. The chosen capital were Brasília, Recife, Salvador, Rio de Janeiro and Belém. In each project the show would be recorded a show piece with a musical block chosen for each city and after being closed block continue with the show for the audience.

Show

Opening 
The start was discussed in an opening for the whole country culture but Joelma've chosen to only to the capitals where they were printed.

For each city we used the theme of culture, first to Belém culture with Carimbó, then a soldier representing Brasilia with a musical background of the start of the national anthem, then immediately one dancer Frevo representing Recife an instrumental sound Tchau Pra Você but executed in the rhythm of Frevo, after that a player of Capoeira representing Salvador and to end a flag bearer representing the Rio de Janeiro with the instrumental sound of Isso é Calypso in rhythm Samba.

2006 live albums
Banda Calypso albums